The 1988–89 St. Louis Blues season was the St. Louis Blues' 22nd season in the National Hockey League (NHL).

Offseason
Team captain Brian Sutter retires to become the new head coach. Forward Bernie Federko is named team captain.

NHL Draft

Regular season

The Blues tied the Washington Capitals for most shutouts in the league, with 6.

Final standings

Schedule and results

Player statistics

Forwards
Note: GP= Games played; G= Goals; AST= Assists; PTS = Points; PIM = Points

Defencemen
Note: GP= Games played; G= Goals; AST= Assists; PTS = Points; PIM = Points

Goaltending
Note: GP= Games played; W= Wins; L= Losses; T = Ties; SO = Shutouts; GAA = Goals Against

Awards and honors
Dan Kelly (sportscaster), Lester Patrick Trophy (posthumous selection)

References
 Blues on Hockey Database
 Blues on Hockey Reference

St.
St.
St. Louis Blues seasons
St Louis
St Louis